Norman Scott may refer to:

People
Norman Scott (admiral) (1889–1942), admiral in the United States Navy
Norman Scott (bass) (1921–1968), American opera singer
Norm Scott (1921–1957), Australian footballer for Geelong
Norman M. Scott, Canadian figure skater
Norman Josiffe, also known as Norman Scott, key figure in the Thorpe affair

Other
USS Norman Scott (DD-690)

Scott, Norman